Splendrillia buicki is a species of sea snail, a marine gastropod mollusk in the family Drilliidae.

Description

Distribution
This marine species is endemic to Australia and occurs off Western Australia

References

 Wells, F.E. 1990. Revision of the recent Australian Turridae referred to the genera Splendrillia and Austrodrillia. Journal of the Malacological Society of Australasia 11: 73–117

External links

buicki
Gastropods of Australia
Gastropods described in 1990